Peter Stopforth (22 October 1908 – 29 October 1987) was a South African cricketer. He played in fourteen first-class matches between 1925/26 and 1936/37.

See also
 List of Eastern Province representative cricketers

References

External links
 

1908 births
1987 deaths
South African cricketers
Eastern Province cricketers
Griqualand West cricketers
Cricketers from Kimberley, Northern Cape